La Mujer Prohibida is a 1991 Venezuelan telenovela produced by Venevisión and Spanish-based production company Telecinco. An original story written by Manuel Muñoz Rico and adapted by Alberto Gómez, it starred Dominican-Mexican actor Andrés García accompanied by Mayra Alejandra, Fernando Carrillo and Tatiana Capote.

Plot
La Mujer Prohibida is a beautiful story of an impossible love between two people who love each other deeply. Irene Rivas is a young woman of twenty-six who is mute. Unfortunately, in order to save her father from prison, she is forced to marry a man she doesn't love, Germán Gallardo. Germán is a man who is powerful, ruthless and arrogant, and he has nothing in common with the great love of Irene, Carlos Luis, the latter's son whom he met before being forced to marry him. Irene work hard to find happiness but discovers many secrets from the past that could destroy her future forever.

Love, hope, passion, jealousy and intrigue, are the ingredients of this great telenovela, framing his strong and realistic story in the most beautiful locations of Venezuela and Spain.

Cast
 Andrés García- Germán Gallardo
 Mayra Alejandra- Irene Rivas
 Tatiana Capote- Yarima Báez de Gallardo
 Fernando Carrillo- Carlos Luis Gallardo
 Henry Galue- Diego Ley 
 Abril Méndez- Rosalinda Pacheco 
 Miguel Alcántara- Alberto Moncada  
 Concha Rosales- Pilar Martínez 
 Liliana Durán- Flora 
 Marita Capote
 Marisela Buitriago
 Nancy González
 Angelica Arenas
 Francisco Ferrari- Jesus Rivas
 Andrés Magdaleno- 
 Alberto Marín- Toneco
 Eva Mondolfi-
 Ramón Hinojosa
 Manuel Carrillo- Álvaro Ley
 Carolina Cristancho- Rosalinda Pacheco
 Gonzalo Velutini-
 Chumico Romero- Lázaro
 María Elena Coello
 Gerardo Marrero
 Laura Zerpa
 Isabel Hungría
 Lucy Orta
 Juan Galeno
 Israel Maranatha
 Miguel David Díaz
 Bárbara Mosquera- Peluca
 Marta Carbillo
 Jimmy Verdum
 Ana Massimo
 Adela Romero
 Carolina Muzziotti
 Hans Schiffer- Guavino
 Wilmer Ramírez- Chucho
 Iñaqui Guevara
 Angélica Castro
 David Bermudez- Acido
 Lisbeth López
 María Antonieta Avallone- Milagrito
 Joel de la Rosa- Matías
 Giovanni Duran
 Carmen Julia Alvarez- Estella di Salvatorri
 Zoe Ducós- fiorella di Salvatorri
 Daniela Alvarado- Martica Gallardo
 María de Lourdes Devonish
 Ana Martínez
 Juan Carlos Vivas- Daniel
 Elizabeth López- Ivonne
 Henry Salvat

References

External links
 Venevisión Promo "La Mujer Prohibida" 1991 at YouTube

Venevisión telenovelas
1991 telenovelas
Venezuelan telenovelas
1991 Venezuelan television series debuts
1992 Venezuelan television series endings
Spanish-language telenovelas
Television shows set in Venezuela